The 1985 South American Rugby Championship was the 14th edition of the competition of the leading national Rugby Union teams in South America.

The tournament was played in Asuncion and won by Argentina .

Standings 

{| class="wikitable"
|-
!width=165|Team
!width=40|Played
!width=40|Won
!width=40|Drawn
!width=40|Lost
!width=40|For
!width=40|Against
!width=40|Difference
!width=40|Pts
|- bgcolor=#ccffcc align=center
|align=left| 
|3||3||0||0||224||25||+ 199||6
|- align=center
|align=left| 
|3||1||1||1||35||75||- 40||3
|- align=center
|align=left| 
|3||1||0||2||24||81||- 57||2
|- align=center
|align=left| 
|3||0||1||2||24||126||- 102||1
|}

Results 

First round

Second round

Third Round

Notes

References

1985
1985 rugby union tournaments for national teams
1985 in Argentine rugby union
rugby union
rugby union
rugby union
International rugby union competitions hosted by Paraguay